A Rogue's Romance is a 1919 American silent crime drama film produced and released by the Vitagraph Company of America. It was directed by James Young and starred matinee star Earle Williams. Rudolph Valentino (billed as Rudolph Volantino), who was then a young unknown dancer, also makes an appearance in a bit part as an Apache dancer. The film is now considered lost.

Plot
As described in a film magazine, Jules Marin (Williams), a Paris thief so clever that the police cannot catch him, has been decorated with the Croix de guerre and loves children. He is popular with the underworld and people warn him when the police are coming. He makes an Apache jealous, and this man tells the prefect of police Henri Duval (Shaw) that Marin will be at a particular restaurant. However, Marin is told that one of his adopted orphan, whom he has picked out among the refugees, is sick, and leaves, thus saving himself. On the way to the orphan his car breaks down, and he goes to the home of jeweler Anton Deprenay (Standing) to get a car. The daughter Mme. Helen (Adams) is there alone and, believing that he is on a mission of mercy, lets him use the car, with him leaving his military decoration as collateral. The police later follow and take down the number of the car. When the prefect goes to the Deprenays, the car has been returned. Later, at a party, Marin is introduced to Helen as M. Picard, but she recognizes his voice. Marin recognizes a crooked promoter at the party. A necklace is stolen, and Helen suspects Marin, but he proves his innocence and recovers the gems. Helen tells him that when he gets as good a recognition from society as he obtained in the field of battle, she will be his friend. Marin learns that the promoter has a stock market scheme to swindle the community out of millions, so, while posing as an investigator from Scotland Yard, Marin helps the prefect get the money back. He and Helen ride off in an automobile.

Cast
 Earle Williams as Jules Marin/ M. Picard
 Brinsley Shaw as Henri Duval
 Harry Van Meter as Leon Voliere
 Herbert Standing as Anton Deprenay
 Sidney Franklin as Burgomaster
 Karl Formes as Brulon
 Marian Skinner  
 Harry Dunkinson 
 Mathilde Comont
 Peaches Jackson 
 Jenette Trebol
 Pat Moore 
 Mrs. Griffith
 William Orlamond 
 Rudolph Valentino as An Apache Dancer (credited as Rudolph Volantino)
 Gladys McMurray 
 Katherine Adams as Mme. Helen Deprenay
 Maude George as Jeanne Deprenay

References

External links

 
 

1919 films
1919 crime drama films
1919 lost films
American crime drama films
American black-and-white films
Films directed by James Young
Lost American films
Vitagraph Studios films
American silent feature films
Lost crime drama films
1910s American films
Silent American drama films